Béatrice Hiéronyme de Lorraine (1 July 1662 – 9 February 1738) was a member of the House of Lorraine and was the Abbess of Remiremont. She was a member of the household of Le Grand Dauphin and was the supposed wife of her cousin the Chevalier de Lorraine. She died childless.

Biography

Béatrice Hiéronyme was the eldest daughter of François Marie de Lorraine, Prince de Lillebonne and his second wife Anne de Lorraine. She never married. Known as Mademoiselle de Lillebonne in her youth, she was a member of the Household of Louis, le Grand Dauphin before she took a religious path in life. She was very close to her sister Élisabeth.

While in the household of the Dauphin, she became close to Louise Françoise de Bourbon known as Madame la Duchesse. She was also close to her uncle Charles Henri, Prince of Vaudémont and the  Duke of Vendôme.

A member of the House of Guise founded by Claude, Duke of Guise, he was a Prince of Lorraine as a male line descendant of René II, Duke of Lorraine. At court, she, like his Lorraine family, held the rank of Foreign Prince, a rank which was below that of the immediate Royal Family and Princes of the Blood.

In 1686, she was a proposed bride of Francesco II d'Este, Duke of Modena. Louis XIV had initially supported the marriage but later said he would not involve himself in the union. Instead, Francesco married Margherita Maria Farnese and never had any children.

His paternal first cousins included the Chevalier de Lorraine (lover of Philippe I, Duke of Orléans), Count of Armagnac; his maternal cousins included Louis XIV of France and the above-mentioned Duke of Orléans.

She was made the coadjutrice of Remiremont in 1705; In 1710, she became the Abbess of Remiremont, a prestigious Benedictine abbey near Remiremont, Vosges, France. Taking over from Christina of Salm, she would remain the Princess-Abbess till her death in 1738.

She died in Paris. Saint-Simon said that she married her cousin Philippe de Lorraine.

Ancestry

References and notes

Sources
Georges Poull, La maison ducale de Lorraine, 1991

1662 births
1738 deaths
Beatrice Hieronyme
Beatrice Hieronyme
17th-century French women
18th-century French women
Abbesses of Remiremont
Beatrice Hieronyme
Benedictine abbesses